Nizhniye Karyavdy (Tübänge Qaryawźı) is a rural locality (a selo) in Chekmagushevsky District, Bashkortostan, Russia. The population was 141 as of 2010. There are 2 streets.

Geography 
Nizhniye Karyavdy is located 22 km southwest of Chekmagush (the district's administrative centre) by road. Verkhniye Karyavdy is the nearest rural locality.

References 

Rural localities in Chekmagushevsky District